Shuaibu Amodu (18 April 1958 – 10 June 2016) was a Nigerian football player and coach who played as a forward.

Playing career
Amodu, a striker, played for Dumez and Niger Tornadoes. His playing career ended after he broke his leg.

Coaching career
Amodu managed a number of club sides in Nigeria, such as BCC Lions, El-Kanemi Warriors and Shooting Stars; he also managed Orlando Pirates in South Africa.

He first managed the Nigerian national team from April 2001 to February 2002. Amodu later stated that his dismissal was "unfair", and also said that, a month later, he had yet to receive a formal letter confirming his dismissal.

He was re-appointed manager in April 2008. In December 2009 the Nigeria Football Federation stated that Amodu was under pressure, and in January 2010 there was speculation about his future. He was sacked in February 2010.

Amodu was appointed technical director of Nigeria's national teams in May 2013.

He was re-appointed Nigeria manager in October 2014, replacing Stephen Keshi. It was his fifth spell in charge of the country. Keshi returned to the role two weeks later but was fired in July 2015 and Amodu took over the Eagles again temporarily. He was replaced by Sunday Oliseh on a permanent basis later that month.

Later life and death
Amodu died on 10 June 2016, three days after the death of Stephen Keshi.

References

1958 births
2016 deaths
Nigerian footballers
Niger Tornadoes F.C. players
Association football forwards
Nigerian football managers
El-Kanemi Warriors F.C. managers
Orlando Pirates F.C. managers
Nigeria national football team managers
Nigerian expatriate football managers
Nigerian expatriate sportspeople in South Africa
Expatriate soccer managers in South Africa
2002 African Cup of Nations managers
2010 Africa Cup of Nations managers
BCC Lions F.C. managers
Shooting Stars S.C. managers